The Roman Catholic Archdiocese of Maringá is an archdiocese located in the city of Maringá in Brazil.

History
 February 1, 1956: Established as Diocese of Maringá from the Diocese of Jacarezinho
 October 16, 1979: Promoted as Metropolitan Archdiocese of Maringá

Leadership

Ordinaries
Bishops
Jaime Luiz Coelho (3 December 1956 – 16 October 1979 see below)
Archbishops
Jaime Luiz Coelho (see above 16 October 1979 – 7 May 1997)
 Murilo Sebastião Ramos Krieger, S.C.J. (7 May 1997 – 20 February 2002), appointed, Archbishop of Florianópolis, Santa Catarina
 João Braz de Aviz (17 July 2002 – 18 January 2004), appointed, Archbishop of Brasília, Distrito Federal; future Cardinal
 Anuar Battisti (29 September 2004 – 20 November 2019)
Severino Clasen, O.F.M. (1 July 2020 – )

Other priests of this diocese who became bishops
Edmar Perón, appointed Auxiliary Bishop of São Paulo in 2009
Bruno Elizeu Versari, appointed Coadjutor Bishop of Campo Mourão, Parana in 2017

Suffragan dioceses
 Diocese of Campo Mourão 
 Diocese of Paranavaí
 Diocese of Umuarama

Sources
 GCatholic.org
 Catholic Hierarchy
  Archdiocese website (Portuguese)

Roman Catholic dioceses in Brazil
Roman Catholic ecclesiastical provinces in Brazil
 
Christian organizations established in 1956
Roman Catholic dioceses and prelatures established in the 20th century
Maringá